Laal maans (Hindi: लाल मांस; lit. "red mutton") is a meat curry from Rajasthan, India. It is a mutton curry prepared in a sauce of yoghurt and hot spices such as red Mathania chillies. This dish typically is very hot and rich in garlic. The gravy may be thick or liquid and is eaten with chapatis made out of wheat (usually eaten in summers) or bajra (a millet grown in Rajasthan and eaten in the winter months).

Chef Bulai Swain said that: "Traditionally, laal maas was made with wild game meat (jungli maas), such as boar or deer and chillies were used to veil the gamy odour of the meat. It was a favourite among the royalties. While the spicy flavour is remained intact now, the meat used is tender mutton."

See also

 Indian cuisine

References

Indian meat dishes
South Asian curries
Rajasthani cuisine
Lamb dishes
How To Prepare The Best Rajasthani Laal Maas at Home